In molecular biology the ZZ-type zinc finger domain is a type of protein domain that was named because of its ability to bind two zinc ions. These domains contain 4-6 Cys residues that participate in zinc binding (plus additional Ser/His residues), including a Cys-X2-Cys motif found in other zinc finger domains. These zinc fingers are thought to be involved in protein-protein interactions. The structure of the ZZ domain shows that it belongs to the family of cross-brace zinc finger motifs that include the PHD, RING, and FYVE domains. ZZ-type zinc finger domains are found in:

Transcription factors P300 and CBP.
Plant proteins involved in light responses, such as Hrb1.
E3 ubiquitin ligases MEX and MIB2 (EC).
Dystrophin and its homologues
Single copies of the ZZ zinc finger occur in the transcriptional adaptor/coactivator proteins P300, in cAMP response element-binding protein (CREB)-binding protein (CBP) and ADA2. CBP provides several binding sites for transcriptional coactivators. The site of interaction with the tumour suppressor protein p53 and the oncoprotein E1A with CBP/P300 is a Cys-rich region that incorporates two zinc-binding motifs: ZZ-type and TAZ2-type. The ZZ-type zinc finger of CBP contains two twisted anti-parallel beta-sheets and a short alpha-helix, and binds two zinc ions. One zinc ion is coordinated by four cysteine residues via 2 Cys-X2-Cys motifs, and the third zinc ion via a third Cys-X-Cys motif and a His-X-His motif. The first zinc cluster is strictly conserved, whereas the second zinc cluster displays variability in the position of the two His residues.

In Arabidopsis thaliana (Mouse-ear cress), the hypersensitive to red and blue 1 (Hrb1) protein, which regulating both red and blue light responses, contains a ZZ-type zinc finger domain.

ZZ-type zinc finger domains have also been identified in the testis-specific E3 ubiquitin ligase MEX that promotes death receptor-induced apoptosis. MEX has four putative zinc finger domains: one ZZ-type, one SWIM-type and two RING-type. The region containing the ZZ-type and RING-type zinc fingers is required for interaction with UbcH5a and MEX self-association, whereas the SWIM domain was critical for MEX ubiquitination.

In addition, the Cys-rich domains of dystrophin, utrophin and an 87kDa post-synaptic protein contain a ZZ-type zinc finger with high sequence identity to P300/CBP ZZ-type zinc fingers. In dystrophin and utrophin, the ZZ-type zinc finger lies between a WW domain (flanked by and EF hand) and the C-terminal coiled-coil domain. Dystrophin is thought to act as a link between the actin cytoskeleton and the extracellular matrix, and perturbations of the dystrophin-associated complex, for example, between dystrophin and the transmembrane glycoprotein beta-dystroglycan, may lead to muscular dystrophy. Dystrophin and its autosomal homologue utrophin interact with beta-dystroglycan via their C-terminal regions, which are composed of a WW domain, an EF hand domain, and a ZZ-type zinc finger domain. The WW domain is the primary site of interaction between dystrophin or utrophin and dystroglycan, while the EF hand and ZZ-type zinc finger domains stabilise and strengthen this interaction.

References

Protein domains